The women's K-4 500 metres canoeing event at the 2015 Pan American Games was held on July 11 at the Welland Pan Am Flatwater Centre in Welland. The defending Pan American Games champion are Kathleen Fraser, Kristin Gauthier, Alexa Irvin and Una Lounder of Canada.

Qualification

The top five boats including the host nation of Canada at the 2014 Pan American Championships in Mexico City, Mexico qualified to compete at the games. All other countries that competed, qualified through the reallocation process.

Schedule
The following is the competition schedule for the event:

All times are Eastern Daylight Time (UTC−4)

Results

Final

References

Canoeing at the 2015 Pan American Games
2015 in women's canoeing